The George Hill Building is an historic structure located at 527 F Street in San Diego's Gaslamp Quarter, in the U.S. state of California. It was built in 1897.

See also
 List of Gaslamp Quarter historic buildings

External links

 

1897 establishments in California
Buildings and structures completed in 1897
Buildings and structures in San Diego
Gaslamp Quarter, San Diego